Neville Dwight Oxford (born 18 November 1948) is a Jamaican former footballer who played at both professional and international levels as a forward.

Career
Oxford spent two seasons with the New York Generals, making 11 appearances, having previously played for Cavalier in Jamaica.

He also spent time with the Jamaican national side, making his debut for the country at the age of 16. During his career, Oxford made 24 appearances for Jamaica.

Personal life
Oxford's brother Karl has a grandson, Reece Oxford, who is also a professional footballer.

References

1948 births
Living people
Sportspeople from Kingston, Jamaica
Jamaican footballers
Jamaican expatriate footballers
Jamaica international footballers
Cavalier F.C. players
New York Generals (NPSL) players
New York Generals players
National Professional Soccer League (1967) players
North American Soccer League (1968–1984) players
Association football forwards
Expatriate soccer players in the United States
Jamaican expatriate sportspeople in the United States